Graham John Healy (born 18 August 1956) is a former Australian politician. He was the National Party member for Toowoomba North in the Legislative Assembly of Queensland from 1992 to 2001.

Healy was born in Toowoomba and was a radio broadcaster and political commentator before his election. Having been elected to parliament in 1992, he was Parliamentary Secretary to the Minister for Families, Youth and Community Care from February to June 1998. Following the Coalition's defeat at that year's election, he became Shadow Minister for Tourism, Sport and Racing, moving to Small Business in February 1999. Healy was defeated at the 2001 state election.

References

1956 births
Living people
National Party of Australia members of the Parliament of Queensland
Members of the Queensland Legislative Assembly
21st-century Australian politicians